Right Time, Right Place is a duo album by American jazz vibraphonist Gary Burton and Canadian pianist Paul Bley. The album was recorded in Denmark and released in 1990 via GNP Crescendo label.

Background
The album contains recordings performed by the two musicians in the studio of the Danish broadcaster on 29 March 1990. Burton and Bley were in Denmark at the request of the Danish Jazz Center. Each played there with his own ensemble, but for this album they played only as a duo. The binding factor for Burton and Bley is jazz composer Carla Bley. Burton played her pieces relatively often, and Paul Bley was her husband. The album contains solo pieces for vibraphone (tracks 3 & 11) and piano (tracks 6,7 & 8); the other recordings are duets.

Reception
Scott Yanow of AllMusic stated: "On their six duets, Burton and Bley do not take turns soloing per se as much as alternate being the lead voice. Their unaccompanied features (three apiece) are generally in the same introspective but exploratory mood, making this a quiet program of thought-provoking if occasionally sleepy music." Brian Glasser in Q Magazine called it "a pleasing mix of well and lesser-known material."

Track listing

Personnel
Band
 Paul Bley – piano 
 Gary Burton – vibraphone
 
Production
 Lars Palsig – engineer 
 Jan Persson – photography 
 Ib Skovgaard – producer

References

External links and sources

1990 albums
Gary Burton albums
Paul Bley albums